Shelby Forest is an unincorporated community in Shelby County, Tennessee, United States. The area includes the former communities of Benjestown, Locke, Cuba, and Woodstock each previously maintaining their own post office.

Education
The Shelby Forest community is serviced by Shelby County Schools, including Millington Central High School. Millington Central High School is operated by the Millington Municipal School District.

Recreation
Meeman-Shelby Forest State Park is adjacent to the community and provides many activities.
It also meets up with the Mississippi River, and has a boat ramp.

Notable people
Justin Timberlake grew up in the Shelby Forest community.
Al Green also resides here.

References

Unincorporated communities in Shelby County, Tennessee
Memphis metropolitan area
Populated places established in 1830
1830 establishments in Tennessee
Unincorporated communities in Tennessee